Akhisar Belediyespor,  is a Turkish professional basketball club based in Akhisar, Manisa which plays Turkish Basketball League (TBL). It is a branch of the multi-sports club of Akhisar Belediyespor. The team was founded by Akhisar Municipality in 2011. Their home arena is Akhisar Belediye Sports Hall with a capacity of 1,800 seats.

External links 
 Akhisar Belediyespor, Official Website
 Eurobasket.com Page

Basketball
Basketball teams in Turkey
Basketball teams established in 2011
Sport in Manisa